Jean-Paul Randriamanana (June 27, 1959 – November 9, 2011) was the Roman Catholic titular bishop of Paria in Proconsolare and auxiliary bishop of the Roman Catholic Archdiocese of Antananarivo, Madagascar.

Ordained in 1979, Randriamanana was named bishop in 1999, dying in office.

See also

Notes

21st-century Roman Catholic bishops in Madagascar
1959 births
2011 deaths
Malagasy Roman Catholic bishops
Roman Catholic bishops of Antananarivo